Jack Coughlin may refer to:

Jack Coughlin (author) (born 1966), author and United States Marine
Jack Coughlin (artist) (born 1932), artist of Irish-American heritage
Jack Coughlin (ice hockey) (1892–?), Canadian ice hockey player

See also 
 John Coughlin (disambiguation)